The Stonehill Skyhawks women's basketball team represents Stonehill College in Easton, Massachusetts, United States. The Skyhawks currently compete in the Division I Northeast Conference after transitioning from the Division II Northeast-10 Conference on July 1, 2022. Due to the NCAA's policy on reclassifying programs, the Skyhawks will not be eligible to compete in the NCAA tournament until the 2026–27 season.

The team is currently led by 21st-year head coach Trisha Brown and play their home games at Merkert Gymnasium.

See also
Stonehill Skyhawks men's basketball

References

External links
Website